The INtime Real Time Operating System (RTOS) family is based on a 32-bit RTOS conceived to run time-critical operations cycle-times as low as 50μs. INtime RTOS runs on single-core, hyper-threaded, and multi-core x86 PC platforms from Intel and AMD. It supports two binary compatible usage configurations; INtime for Windows, where the INtime RTOS runs alongside Microsoft Windows®, and INtime Distributed RTOS, where INtime runs one.

Like its iRMX predecessors, INtime is a real-time operating system, and like DOSRMX and iRMX for Windows, it runs concurrently with a general-purpose operating system on a single hardware platform.

History

Initial Release

INtime 1.0 was originally introduced in 1997 in conjunction with the Windows NT operating system. Since then it has been upgraded to include support for all subsequent protected-mode Microsoft Windows platforms, Windows XP to Windows 10.

INtime can also be used as a stand-alone RTOS. INtime binaries are able to run unchanged when running on a stand-alone node of the INtime RTOS. Unlike Windows, INtime can run on an Intel 80386 or equivalent processor. Current versions of the Windows operating system generally require at least a Pentium level processor in order to boot and execute.

Version 2.2

After spinning off from Radisys in 2000 development work on INtime continued at TenAsys Corporation. In 2003 TenAsys released version 2.2 of INtime.

Notable features of version 2.2 include:
 Real-time Shared Libraries, or RSLs, which are the functional equivalent of the Windows Dynamically Loaded Libraries, or DLLs.
 Support for the development of USB clients, and USB host control drivers for OHCI, UHCI and EHCI (USB 2.0) devices.
 A new timing acquisition and display application called ""INscope"" is released.

Notes

Real-time operating systems
Embedded operating systems